Union Township, Ohio may refer to:

Union Township, Auglaize County, Ohio
Union Township, Belmont County, Ohio
Union Township, Brown County, Ohio
Union Township, Carroll County, Ohio
Union Township, Champaign County, Ohio
Union Township, Clermont County, Ohio
Union Township, Clinton County, Ohio
Union Township, Fayette County, Ohio
Union Township, Hancock County, Ohio
Union Township, Highland County, Ohio
Union Township, Knox County, Ohio
Union Township, Lawrence County, Ohio
Union Township, Licking County, Ohio
Union Township, Logan County, Ohio
Union Township, Madison County, Ohio
Union Township, Mercer County, Ohio
Union Township, Miami County, Ohio
Union Township, Morgan County, Ohio
Union Township, Muskingum County, Ohio
Union Township, Pike County, Ohio
Union Township, Putnam County, Ohio
Union Township, Ross County, Ohio
Union Township, Scioto County, Ohio
Union Township, Tuscarawas County, Ohio
Union Township, Union County, Ohio
Union Township, Van Wert County, Ohio
Union Township, Warren County, Ohio
West Chester Township, Butler County, Ohio, which was named Union Township until 2000

See also
Union Township, Ohio (disambiguation)

Ohio township disambiguation pages